Samlar machu ( – 'sour soup') is a Khmer term for a category of sour soups.

The sour flavour of the soup comes from the use of tamarind, however variations also include other tangy fruits and vegetables such as tomatoes, pineapples, Ipomoea aquatica, celery, as well as Tiliacora triandra leaves. There are many types of Khmer sour soups such as: 
Samlar machu yuon with lobster, fish or chicken, pineapple, dried fish and tomatoes; 
Samlar machu srae with fresh and dried fish, crab and green papaya;
Samlar machu kroeung with beef or pork, yellow kroeung, Ipomoea aquatica, eggplants and dried jamalac.
Samlar machu ktis with pork, pineapple and coconut milk.
Meat in this type of soup is usually that of either chicken, fish, pork, beef, lobster or crab. In the U.S. and Canada, instead of using fresh tamarind like in Cambodia, a powdered tamarind soup base mix is also used by the diaspora. One popular brand is manufactured by Knorr.

References

Cambodian soups
Vegetable dishes